Ochrolechia is a genus of crustose lichens in the family Ochrolechiaceae.

Species
, Species Fungorum accepts 38 species of Ochrolechia:

Ochrolechia aegaea 
Ochrolechia africana 
Ochrolechia alaskana 
Ochrolechia alticola 
Ochrolechia androgyna 
Ochrolechia arborea 
Ochrolechia brodoi 
Ochrolechia cooperi 
Ochrolechia frigida 
Ochrolechia gyrophorica 
Ochrolechia inaequatula 
Ochrolechia incarnata 
Ochrolechia insularis 
Ochrolechia inversa 
Ochrolechia kerguelensis 
Ochrolechia lijiangensis 
Ochrolechia longispora 
Ochrolechia macrosperma 
Ochrolechia microstictoides 
Ochrolechia minuta 
Ochrolechia neoisidiata 
Ochrolechia pallenti-isidiata 
Ochrolechia pallescens 
Ochrolechia parella 
Ochrolechia pseudotartarea 
Ochrolechia rhodoleuca 
Ochrolechia rugomarginata 
Ochrolechia splendens 
Ochrolechia subathallina 
Ochrolechia subpallescens 
Ochrolechia subrhodotropa 
Ochrolechia subrosella 
Ochrolechia subviridis 
Ochrolechia szatalaensis 
Ochrolechia tartarea 
Ochrolechia tiroliensis 
Ochrolechia turneri 
Ochrolechia upsaliensis 
Ochrolechia weymouthii 
Ochrolechia xanthostoma

References

Pertusariales
Plant dyes
Pertusariales genera
Taxa described in 1852
Taxa named by Abramo Bartolommeo Massalongo
Lichen genera